Abigail Lane (born 1967) is an English artist who works in photography, wax casting, printing and sound. Lane was one of the exhibitors in the 1988 Damien Hirst-led Freeze exhibition—a mixed show of art which was significant in the development of the later-to-be YBA scene of art.

Life and work

Lane was born in Penzance, Cornwall. She studied at Bristol Polytechnic and Goldsmiths College, University of London.
Lanes work attempts to address an absence of an artist or "missing person". She uses clues and photographs as a trace or evidence to her work inviting the audience to piece together a narrative or event that has taken place. Abigail Lane's work presents a disturbing subject matter which creates an alluring effect, Tracey Emin states, "Abigail could show the contents of her fridge and it would be fantastic."

Lane exhibited in the Damien Hirst curated Freeze in 1988, with others including Gary Hume RA, Sarah Lucas and Fiona Rae RA. Karsten Schubert gave her the first solo show in 1992. One of her most well known shows was 'Skin of Teeth' hosted at The Institute of Contemporary Arts in 1995. Lane went on to have a solo show at the Bonnefanten Museum in Maastricht in 1996.

In October 2003, with her two friends Bob Pain and Brigitte Stepputtis, Lane launched a design company in 2003 from her London based studio called "Showroom Dummies" . "Showroom Dummies" included a collection of cushions, tiles, fabrics, blankets, uniforms and wall coverings which Lane described as 'things I would want in my own house"

Exhibitions 

 Freeze, Surrey Docks, London, 1988 
 New Contemporaries, Institute of Contemporary Arts, London, 1989
 Modern Medicine, Building One, London, 1990
 Show Hide Show, Anderson O'Day Gallery, London, 1991 
 Mat Collishaw, Angus Fairhurst, Abigail Lane, Via Farini, Milan, Italy, 1992 
 Abigail Lane: Making History Karsten Schubert, 1992
 Group show, Barbara Gladstone Gallery and Stein Gladstone Gallery, New York, 1992 
 20 Fragile Pieces. Galerie Barbara et Luigi Polla, Geneva, Switzerland, 1992  
 Skin of Teeth, Institute of Contemporary Arts, London, 1995 
 Privacy, Documentario, Milan, Italy, 1993

See also
Young British Artists
Freeze exhibition

References

External links
Showroom Dummies
http://www.eyestorm.com/abigail-lane.html
Photo of Abigail Lane
Article on Abigail Lane
 Christies

1967 births
British conceptual artists
British contemporary artists
Women conceptual artists
English installation artists
English women artists
Alumni of Goldsmiths, University of London
Alumni of the University of the West of England, Bristol
Living people
People from Penzance
English contemporary artists
21st-century British women artists
20th-century English women
20th-century English people
21st-century English women
21st-century English people